Heritage trails are walking trails and driving routes in urban and rural settings that are identified by signage and guidebooks as relating to cultural heritage. The heritage might be built architecture, or it can be a cultural heritage narrative. In most cases it is in public space.

The nature of the trail can be seen to be beneficial for community development, community participation, for discovering community heritage, and for involvement by community in developing the trails.

Heritage Walks are a means of discovering the undiscovered and undiscovered riches of the country. It contributes to the development of the city's history and character through the development of an interest in urban conservation activities and local community involvement. Heritage Walk can encourage people to support projects like conservation and protection of historical monuments by collecting authentic information about them and publishing them through various media. The residences of prominent citizens are also part of the heritage. Socially, heritage assets have the potential to contribute to the life and identity of an area. In many cases, they are places that are focal points for community activities, such as public halls, schools, mechanics' institutes, places of religious worship, and parks.

Mehrauli Heritage Trail Walk.

See also
National Historic Trail
Heritage trails in Hong Kong
W.A. Heritage Trails Network

Notes

Further reading
 Ruitenberg, Claudia W. "Learning by Walking: Non-Formal Education as Curatorial Practice and Intervention in Public Space." International Journal of Lifelong Education 31, no. 3 (2012): 261-275.
 Wynn, Jonathan R. The Tour Guide: Walking and Talking New York. Chicago: The University of Chicago Press, 2011.
 Wynn, Jonathan R. "City Tour Guides: Urban Alchemists at Work." City & Community 9, no. 2 (June 2010).

Types of tourism
Tourist activities
Heritage trails